Bolsheglushitsky District is an administrative and municipal district (raion), one of the twenty-seven in Samara Oblast, Russia. It is located in the south of the oblast. Its administrative center is the rural locality (a selo) of Bolshaya Glushitsa. Population: 20,477 (2010 Census);  The population of Bolshaya Glushitsa accounts for 47.2% of the district's total population.

References

Notes

Sources

Districts of Samara Oblast